Williams Cone is a satellite cone of Mount Edziza, located  east of Telegraph Creek. It lies just off the northern edge of the Tencho Icefield and is one of the many postglacial cinder cones that lie on the Mount Edziza volcanic complex. Williams Cone last erupted about 1,350 years ago along with other nearby volcanoes, such as the well-preserved Eve Cone.

See also
 List of volcanoes in Canada
 List of Northern Cordilleran volcanoes
 Volcanism of Canada
 Volcanism of Western Canada

References

External links

Cinder cones of British Columbia
Mount Edziza volcanic complex
Holocene volcanoes
Monogenetic volcanoes
Two-thousanders of British Columbia